USS Taylor may refer to:

  was a  1942 to 1969, and later transferred to the Italian Navy as Lanciere (D-560)

See also
 USS David W. Taylor (DD-551)
 USS Lawrence C. Taylor (DE-415)
 

United States Navy ship names